Hakea gibbosa, commonly known as hairy hakea or needlebush hakea, is a shrub of the family Proteaceae, and is endemic to south eastern Australia. It has very prickly foliage, cream-yellowish flowers from April to July, and provides shelter for small birds. It has become an environmental weed in South Africa and New Zealand, where it had been introduced for use as a hedge plant.

Description

It may be bushy or slender, and does not form a lignotuber. The new growth and leaves are thickly covered with fine brown hairs, becoming smooth as they age. Flowering occurs from April to July. The fruits contain two seeds. and are retained on the shrub.

Taxonomy
The species was first described by James Edward Smith who named the species Banksia gibbosa in 1790. In 1800 the Spanish taxonomic botanist Antonio José Cavanilles gave it its current name. The British botanist  Richard Anthony Salisbury had given it the name Banksia pinifolia in 1796, upon which Joseph Knight based his name and reallocated it to Hakea as the pine-leaved hakea (H. pinifolia) in his controversial 1809 work On the cultivation of the plants belonging to the natural order of Proteeae.

Distribution and habitat
Needlebush hakea is restricted to the Sydney basin in central New South Wales, It is found on sandstone ridges and cliffs in heathland, with red bloodwood (Corymbia gummifera), tea tree (Leptospermum trinervium), dagger hakea (Hakea teretifolia), heath banksia (Banksia ericifolia), and conesticks (Petrophile pulchella).

Plants found in Queensland which were classified as this species have been renamed as a new species Hakea actites.

Hakea gibbosa is a Category 1 Plant on the Declared Weeds & Invaders list for South Africa. It has become naturalised in northern parts of North Island in New Zealand.

Ecology

Small birds use the prickly foliage as shelter. The seeds are eaten by the Yellow-tailed Black Cockatoo.

Cultivation
Hakea gibbosa adapts readily to cultivation and is easy to grow with good drainage and a sunny aspect, though its prickly foliage may be a deterrent.

The gum was investigated for use in sustained-release tablets in 1999.

References

gibbosa
Flora of New South Wales
Plants described in 1790